Sergeant Alfred Joseph Richards VC (21 June 1879 – 21 May 1953) was an English recipient of the Victoria Cross, the highest and most prestigious award for gallantry in the face of the enemy that can be awarded to British and Commonwealth forces.

Richards was 35 years old, and a sergeant in the 1st Battalion, The Lancashire Fusiliers, British Army during the First World War when the following deed took place for which he was awarded the VC.

On 25 April 1915 west of Cape Helles, Gallipoli, Turkey, three companies and the Headquarters of the 1st Battalion, Lancashire Fusiliers, when landing on W Beach, were met by deadly fire from hidden machine-guns which caused many casualties. The survivors, however, rushed up and cut the wire entanglements, notwithstanding the terrific fire from the enemy and, after overcoming supreme difficulties, the cliffs were gained and the position maintained.

Sergeant Richards was one of six members of the regiment elected for the award, the others being Cuthbert Bromley, John Elisha Grimshaw, William Kenealy, Frank Edward Stubbs, and Richard Raymond Willis.

As a result of a wound sustained in the action  Richards had to have his leg amputated and was discharged from the army as unfit for further service. Despite this he served in the Home Guard during World War II as a provost sergeant.

Richards is buried in Putney Vale Cemetery.

The Medal
His medal was purchased by Lord Ashcroft at auction in 2005.

References

Further reading
Monuments to Courage (David Harvey, 1999)
The Register of the Victoria Cross (This England, 1997)
VCs of the First World War - Gallipoli (Stephen Snelling, 1995)

External links
Lancashire Fusiliers website

1879 births
1953 deaths
Military personnel from Plymouth, Devon
British Gallipoli campaign recipients of the Victoria Cross
Lancashire Fusiliers soldiers
British Army personnel of World War I
Burials at Putney Vale Cemetery
British Home Guard soldiers
English amputees
British Army recipients of the Victoria Cross